HVDC DolWin2 is a high voltage direct current (HVDC) link to transmit offshore wind power to the power grid of the German mainland. The project differs from most HVDC systems in that one of the two converter stations is built on a platform in the sea.  Voltage-Sourced Converters with DC ratings of 900 MW, ±320 kV are used and the total cable length is 135 km. The project is similar to the HVDC DolWin1 project but has a slightly higher power rating and uses a different design of offshore platform. The platform was designed by Norwegian company Aibel and built by Drydocks World in Dubai and transported to Europe in the summer of 2014 to be fitted out at the Aibel yard in Haugesund in Norway.  The platform, which is of a floating, self-installing design not previously used in an HVDC project, sailed out from Haugesund on 1 August 2015 and was installed in the North Sea ten days later.

The overall project was built by ABB and was handed over to its owner, TenneT, in 2017.

See also

High-voltage direct current
Offshore wind power
HVDC BorWin1
HVDC BorWin2
HVDC BorWin3
HVDC DolWin1
HVDC DolWin3
HVDC HelWin1
HVDC HelWin2
HVDC SylWin1

References

External links 
Description of project on TenneT website (in German).
 Dolwin2, ABB website.
ABB installs Dolwin beta - world's most powerful offshore converter platform in the North Sea, YouTube video.

ABB
Electric power transmission systems in Germany
Energy infrastructure completed in 2017
HVDC transmission lines
Wind power in Germany
2017 establishments in Germany